Bahar Avaz Muradova (born 20 March 1962) is an Azerbaijani politician affiliated to the New Azerbaijan Party and former deputy speaker of the National Assembly of Azerbaijan (2005–2019).

Early life
Born in Füzuli, Füzuli rayon on 20 March 1962, Muradova attended the Baku Light Industry Technical School, from where she received a diploma in textile industry. Later she joined the Baku State University to study Law. She did her doctorate in Political Science.

Career
In 1981, Muradova took up the job of supervisor at a textile factory in Baku. Later, she turned to politics and became a member of New Azerbaijan Party (YAP) in 1993 and has since held important positions within the party, including that of deputy chairman of party's female cadre and a deputy executive secretary. From 1995 to 2000, Muradova served in the Office of the Azerbaijani President. After winning the Azerbaijani parliamentary election in 2005, she was appointed the deputy speaker of the National Assembly of Azerbaijan. She is a recipient of the Order of Glory and has also published five scholarly papers. She retained her seat from Füzuli̇ in the 2015 Azerbaijani parliamentary election. Bahar Muradova was appointed the chairperson of the State Committee on Family, Women and Children Affairs of Azerbaijan on March 12, 2020 by the President Ilham Aliyev.

Personal life
Muradova is married and has one daughter.

References

1962 births
Living people
21st-century Azerbaijani women politicians
21st-century Azerbaijani politicians
Members of the National Assembly (Azerbaijan)
Women members of the National Assembly (Azerbaijan)
New Azerbaijan Party politicians
20th-century Azerbaijani lawyers
Azerbaijan University of Languages alumni
People from Fuzuli District
Recipients of the Azerbaijan Democratic Republic 100th anniversary medal